Cornelia Gassner (1958-2016), was a Liechtensteiner politician. She served as government minister of Building and Transport in 1993-1997. She was the first woman minister in Liechtenstein, where women's suffrage had not been introduced until 1984.

References

1958 births
2016 deaths
Women government ministers of Liechtenstein